Toxotomimus is a genus of longhorn beetles of the subfamily Lamiinae, containing the following species:

 Toxotomimus baladicus (Montrouzier, 1861)
 Toxotomimus fasciolatus (Fauvel, 1906)

References

Enicodini